Varuzhan Akobian (born 19 November 1983 in Yerevan, Soviet Union) is an Armenian-born American chess Grandmaster. Originally from Armenia, he now resides in St. Louis. He played on the bronze-medal-winning U.S. team in the 2006 and 2008 Chess Olympiads.

Chess career

Akobian, an Armenian American, became an International Master at age 16. In 2001, he moved to the United States and one week after his 20th birthday in November 2003, earned the title of Grandmaster.
 
He won the World Open tournament in Philadelphia on three separate occasions; he shared first place in 2002 and won it outright in 2004 and 2007. In 2006 he tied for first in the San Marino tournament with a performance rating of 2796. In 2007 he tied for 1st–8th with Hikaru Nakamura, Alexander Shabalov, Darmen Sadvakasov, Zviad Izoria, Victor Mikhalevski, Magesh Chandran Panchanathan and Justin Sarkar in the Miami Open and came equal first in the American Continental Championship in Cali, Colombia. This qualified him for the Chess World Cup 2007, where he was eliminated in the first round. He also took part in the Chess World Cup 2009 and was knocked out by Ruslan Ponomariov in the second round.

In 2007, Akobian was featured on MTV's True Life documentary series, in an episode titled "I'm a Genius".

As of May 2014, he was the fifth highest rated player in the US, with a FIDE rating of 2643.

In May, 2014, while playing the U.S. Chess Championship at Saint Louis he tied for first with Gata Kamsky and Aleksandr Lenderman, going to a three players playoff to decide who would become champion. In an Armageddon Game he defeated Lenderman and went on to a Rapid Match against Kamsky, that resulted 1,5 for Kamsky to 0,5 to Akobian, granting Kamsky the title, and making Akobian the runner up in the 2014 U.S. Chess Championship.

Akobian currently serves as assistant coach for the Saint Louis University chess team.

References

External links

 
 
 
 
 Grandmaster Games Database - Varuzhan Akobian at redhotpawn.com

1983 births
Living people
Armenian chess players
American chess players
Chess grandmasters
Chess Olympiad competitors
Armenian emigrants to the United States
Sportspeople from Yerevan